Ljupčo Jordanovski (13 February 1953 – 7 October 2010) was a Macedonian seismologist and politician.

Education background
Jordanovski was born in Štip. He received his BEng in Electrical Engineering from the University of Zagreb. He received his PhD from the University of Southern California in 1985.

Political activities
He was a member of the Social Democratic Union of Macedonia party. He took office as Speaker of the Assembly on 18 November 2003. 
As Speaker of the Assembly, according to the Republic of Macedonia's constitution he was the successor to the president in the event of the president's inability to serve.

Acting President of Macedonia
Accordingly, when President Boris Trajkovski was killed in a plane crash on 26 February 2004, Jordanovski was sworn in as president.

He was the acting president of the Republic of Macedonia from 26 February 2004 to 12 May 2004.  He left office after presidential elections in which he did not run. He continued in his role as Speaker after his time as acting president, until 2 August 2006.

Ambassador to the United States
On 6 July 2006 he was accredited as the Ambassador of the Republic of Macedonia to the United States of America, but at the end of December he was recalled by the Government of the Republic of Macedonia. He died unexpectedly in Skopje.

References

External links
  – video (Macedonian)

|-

1953 births
2010 deaths
People from Štip
Seismologists
Speakers of the Assembly of North Macedonia
Social Democratic Union of Macedonia politicians
USC Viterbi School of Engineering alumni
Ambassadors of North Macedonia to the United States